Piedmont High School may refer to one of several high schools in the United States:

Piedmont High School (Alabama) — Piedmont, Alabama
Piedmont High School (California) — Piedmont, California
Piedmont High School (North Carolina) — Monroe, North Carolina
Piedmont High School (Oklahoma) — Piedmont, Oklahoma
Piedmont Hills High School — San Jose, California